Elm Grove is an unincorporated community in Bossier Parish, Louisiana, United States. Its ZIP code is 71051.

References 

Unincorporated communities in Louisiana
Unincorporated communities in Bossier Parish, Louisiana
Unincorporated communities in Shreveport – Bossier City metropolitan area